Kyrösjärvi is a medium-sized lake in Finland. It is situated in the municipalities of Ikaalinen, Hämeenkyrö and Ylöjärvi in the Pirkanmaa region in western Finland. The lake is part of the Kokemäenjoki basin and it drains through a chain of lakes into the lake Kulovesi in the south.

See also
List of lakes in Finland

References

External links
 

Kokemäenjoki basin
Landforms of Pirkanmaa
Lakes of Hämeenkyrö